Whales Alive is a 1987 album of improvisational duets and sometimes trios between Paul Winter, Paul Halley, and recordings of humpback whales. Winter and Halley also collaborate with Leonard Nimoy, who reads poems and prose from various writers, including D. H. Lawrence and Roger Payne. The audio recordings made of the whales for this recording were used in the Star Trek IV: The Voyage Home (Nov. 1986) movie (for which Nimoy directed and reprised his character Spock), featuring the whales nicknamed 'George and Gracie'.

Track listing
 "Whales Weep Not! Lullaby From The Great Mother Whale For The Baby Seal Pups"
 "Dawnwatch"
 "George and Gracie"
 "Turning"
 "Concerto For Whale And Organ"
 "Humphrey's Blues"
 "Queequeg and I - The Water Is Wide"
 "Ocean Dream"
 "The Voyage Home"

Personnel
Paul Winter- soprano sax
Paul Halley- organ
Leonard Nimoy- readings

References

"Whales Alive." Living Music.

1987 albums
Living Music albums
Paul Winter albums